Kelsey Wakefield (born 1 June 1991) is an Australian water polo player.  Before choosing water polo, she competed in the high jump at a state and national level. Wakefield has been a member of the Australia women's national water polo team at the junior starting in 2006 and senior level starting in 2009.  She earned a silver medal at the 2010 FINA World League, a gold medal at the 2011 Canada Cup and a bronze medal at the 2011 FINA Junior World Championships.  Wakefield won a championship as a member of the 2011 Brisbane Barracudas squad in the National Water Polo League and has been selected for the preliminary Australian water polo team for the 2012 Summer Olympics. As part of the Aussie Stingers, Wakefield represented Australia at the Rio de Janeiro 2016 Summer Olympics in women's water polo.

Personal
Wakefield was born on 1 June 1991 in Gold Coast, Queensland.

While she was growing up, Wakefield's house had a backyard pool, where she used to train with her sister, Brittany. As a five-year-old, she watched the Olympics on television and dreamed of competing at the Games.

Wakefield attended Trinity Lutheran College, and was a straight-A student. Beyond water polo, while in school, she also competed in the high jump. In 2007, she finished fourth in her age group in high jump at the national championships. She eventually chose water polo over the high jump because she preferred to play a team sport. Her departure from the sport was also a result of conflicting training times between it and water polo.

, the Brisbane-based Wakefield is a student at Griffith University, studying biomedical science studies. She took a semester off from school in order to concentrate full-time on playing water polo with the hope of making the Olympics. One of the reasons she is pursuing a career in medicine is because her father is a doctor. She is thinking of specialising in pediatrics or anesthetics.

Water polo
Wakefield is a member of the Australia women's national water polo team.  She is a goalkeeper. She wears several different numbers including 1, 13 and 18. She took up the sport when she was twelve years old at school. In 2006, at the Australian Country Championships, she competed for the Queensland open women's team. In 2007, she competed at the U16 Australian Water Polo Championships and was named the goalkeeper of the tournament. She competed at the 2009 Australian National U20 Water Polo Championships for Queensland, where her team finished second to New South Wales. She competed at the Australian National U20 competition in 2011, where her team took home gold. She trains at the Queensland Academy of Sport, and during the regular season, she may drive as many as  a week driving between home, university, the Queensland Academy of Sport, to training facilities and competition pools. The City South News in Brisbane describes her as an "Australian water polo prodigy". Between appearances on the junior national team and the senior national team, she has already played more than 50 games for Australia. She currently holds a water polo scholarship at the Australian Institute of Sport.

Club water polo
Wakefield plays club water polo for the Brisbane Barracudas who compete in the National Water Polo League. She was with the team in 2008. She was a member of the team in 2011 when they won the league championship for the third year in a row.  She was in goal for the championship match with the score 4–4 at the end of regular time, 1–1 at the end of over time and finally going to a shootout.  Wakefield was named to the league's 2011 All Star team.

Juniors
Wakefield represented Australia in 2006 at the U16 national team that competed at the New Zealand hosted Pan Pacific Championships. In 2007, she was a member of the U16 national team. In 2008, she was a member of the U16 and U17 national teams, and the first ranked goal keeper on the U16 squad. She was a member of the Australian side that finished third at the 2011 FINA Junior World Championships. She was the captain of the Australian side.  The team finished third after losing to eventual gold medalist, Spain, during the semifinals.

Seniors

Wakefield made her first appearance for the senior side at the 2009 Canada Cup. She was a member of the 2010 team that finished second at the FINA World League Super Finals held in La Jolla, California. She competed at the 2010 Canada Cup. In a preliminary round match against Canada that Australia won 11–5, she made 10 saves in goal. Her team played Italy in the semi-finals of the 2010 Cup. She represented Australia at the 2011 Canada Cup, and participated in the gold medal final match against China that Australia won.  She was named the Goalkeeper of the Tournament. She competed in a warm up match for the 2011 FINA Water Polo World League against Italy in Ostia, Italy in July that Australia won 12–11.

In October 2011, as a representative of the senior squad, she attended a training camp at the Australian Institute of Sport. The camp had four goal Australian goalkeepers at it, of which only two would be named to the squad to compete at the Olympics. She competed in the Pan Pacific Championships in January 2012 for the Australian Stingers. In February 2012, she was named to the final training squad for the 2012 Summer Olympics.  She attended a training camp at the Australian Institute of Sport in February 2012. The team of seventeen players will be cut to thirteen before the team departs for the Olympic games, with the announcement being made on 13 June.
She was part of the Stingers squad that competed in a five-game test against Great Britain at the AIS in late February 2012.  This was the team's first matches against Great Britain's national team in six years. She did not compete in the first match. She competed in the remaining four matches in the series.

Recognition
In 2008, Wakefield was nominated for Gold Coast Sportsperson of the Year. In 2010, she was nominated for the Queensland Junior Sportswoman of the Year.

See also
 Australia women's Olympic water polo team records and statistics
 List of women's Olympic water polo tournament goalkeepers
 List of World Aquatics Championships medalists in water polo

References

External links

 

1991 births
Living people
Sportswomen from Queensland
Sportspeople from the Gold Coast, Queensland
Australian female water polo players
Water polo goalkeepers
Olympic water polo players of Australia
Water polo players at the 2016 Summer Olympics
World Aquatics Championships medalists in water polo
21st-century Australian women